Rouhollah Hejazi (Persian: روح‌الله حجازی, born April 1, 1986) is an Iranian film director, screenwriter and producer.

Filmography

Film

Home video

References

External links 
 

Iranian film producers
Iranian screenwriters
Iranian film directors
People from Abadan, Iran
Living people
1979 births